Thomas Kemp Sanderson (1821 – 24 December 1897) was an English corn merchant from Wakefield
in the West Riding of Yorkshire, and a Conservative Party politician.

He unsuccessfully contested Wakefield at the 1868 general election, when he was beaten by the Liberal Party candidate Somerset Beaumont.

He did not stand in 1874, when the Conservative candidate Edward Green defeated Beaumont.  However, Green's election was voided on petition (due to bribery), and at the resulting by-election in May 1874, he won the seat.

He was defeated at the 1880 general election by the Liberal candidate Robert Bownas Mackie,
another local corn merchant,
who Sanderson had defeated in 1874. He did not stand again.

References

External links 
 

1821 births
1897 deaths
Conservative Party (UK) MPs for English constituencies
UK MPs 1874–1880
Politicians from Wakefield
19th-century English businesspeople